Thomas's mosaic-tailed rat (Paramelomys mollis) is a species of rodent in the family Muridae.
It is found in West Papua, Indonesia and Papua New Guinea.

References

Paramelomys
Rodents of Papua New Guinea
Mammals of Western New Guinea
Mammals described in 1913
Taxonomy articles created by Polbot
Rodents of New Guinea
Taxa named by Oldfield Thomas